Kingennie railway station served the village of Kingennie, Angus, Scotland, from 1870 to 1955 on the Dundee and Forfar direct line.

History 
The station was opened on 14 November 1870 by the Caledonian Railway. On the northbound platform was the station building, on the east side was the goods yard and on the southbound platform was the signal box. It originally had a siding to the north of the crossing. The station closed on 10 January 1955.

References 

Disused railway stations in Angus, Scotland
Former Caledonian Railway stations
Railway stations in Great Britain opened in 1870
Railway stations in Great Britain closed in 1955
1870 establishments in Scotland
1955 disestablishments in Scotland